Basilica of the Assumption may be:

 Basilica of the Assumption and Saint John the Evangelist, Bavaria
 Esztergom Basilica
 Basilica of the Assumption, Aglona, Latvia
 Basilica of the Assumption (Prague), Czech Republic
 Basilica of Our Lady of the Assumption, Alcamo, Sicily, Italy
 Basilica of the Assumption of Our Lady, Brno, Czech Republic
 Basilica of the Assumption of the Blessed Virgin Mary, Székesfehérvár, Hungary
 Basilica of Our Lady of the Assumption, Secunderabad, India
 Archcathedral Basilica of the Assumption of the Blessed Virgin Mary and St. Andrew, Frombork, Poland 
 Cathedral Basilica of the Assumption, Pelplin, Poland

 Basilica of the Assumption of Our Lady of Valencia

See also
 Cathedral of the Assumption (disambiguation)
 Cathedral of Our Lady of the Assumption (disambiguation)
 Cathedral of Saint Mary of the Assumption (disambiguation)
 Cathedral of Santa Maria Assunta (disambiguation)
 Cathedral of the Assumption of the Blessed Virgin Mary (disambiguation)
 Cathedral of the Dormition (disambiguation)